Danielle Demski (born 1981) is a television presenter, actress, and beauty queen from Chandler, Arizona, who has competed in the Miss Teen USA and Miss USA pageants.

Demski won her first pageant title in 1998, when she was crowned Miss Arizona Teen USA 1999. She competed in the Miss Teen USA 1999 pageant held in Shreveport, Louisiana, in August 1999, where she became the third delegate from Arizona to make the semi-finals. Demski placed sixth in the interview competition with a score of 9.22, sixth in swimsuit (9.45) and third in evening gown (9.68), entering the top six in fourth place with an average combined score of 9.45. She retained fourth position following the final question, and placed third runner-up overall.

In 2003 Demski won the Miss Arizona USA 2004 pageant in her first attempt at the title, becoming the third Miss Arizona Teen USA to win the Miss Arizona USA title. She represented Arizona in the Miss USA 2004 pageant broadcast live from the Kodak Theatre in Hollywood, California, on April 11, 2004, and again made the first cut, the first Arizonan to do so since 1998. She competed in the evening gown competition, but did not advance to the top ten. Demski is one of only seventeen women who have placed in both the Miss Teen USA and Miss USA pageants.

Demski is a graduate in of the Walter Cronkite School at Arizona State University, with a degree in broadcast journalism and a minor in theater. She was a cheerleader for the Arizona Cardinals during college. After graduating she has worked as the main presenter for Destination.TV, as a correspondent for the Phoenix Suns and as co-host for an NFL programme on ESPN Radio.

Currently, Demski is working for the World Series of Poker held at the Rio in Las Vegas, NV as a correspondent. She has appeared in several short online videos highlighting tournament play as well as various "featurettes" concerning the tournament and the players on the tournament's Web Site, World Series of Poker Web Site.  Demski is also the host of The Vegas Minute, a weekly video segment which airs on KTLA in Los Angeles, California, several other American television stations, and the website Vegas.com.

Demski is the backup model for Let's Make a Deal, first appearing during Season 5 of the Wayne Brady-hosted version in 2013 when Tiffany Coyne left early in the season to take maternity leave. She continues as the backup, most recently taping during Season 11 in 2019 for some episodes that aired in early 2020 when Coyne was unavailable. In 2014 she appeared on an episode of The Young and the Restless. Additionally, Demski made a few appearances on The Price Is Right.

Demski has also had a few roles in film, such as the role of Alicia in The Pit and the Pendulum (2009 film) and that of Reporter #2 in Blue Lagoon: The Awakening.

References

External links

Official website

1981 births
Living people
1999 beauty pageant contestants
20th-century Miss Teen USA delegates
Miss USA 2004 delegates
Walter Cronkite School of Journalism and Mass Communication alumni
People from Chandler, Arizona
National Football League cheerleaders
American cheerleaders
Let's Make a Deal